Go Lala Go 2 is a 2015 Chinese romantic comedy-drama film directed by Andrew Chien and starring Ariel Lin, Vic Zhou and Chen Bolin. The film is based on a novel and is a sequel to the 2010 film Go Lala Go!. It was released on December 4, 2015.

Cast
Ariel Lin as Du Lala 
Vic Zhou as David Wang
Chen Bolin as Stanley Chen
Nana as Sha Dangdang (voice dub: Liu Meihan)
Vivian Wu as Maggie
Michelle Chen as Carrie
Li Jiahang as Ah Le
John Chiu as Lin Daiyu (voice dub: Xu Ke)
Austin Lin as Xiao Wen
Cindy Sun as Xiao Li
Tony as Howard
James Yang Yong Cong 楊永聰 as James
Yin Hang as Xiao Yi
Liang Chen as Liang Wei
Du Juan as Host
Qiu Muhan

Production
The film was shot in Shanghai, Ko Samui and Taiwan.

Soundtrack

Reception
The film grossed  in China.

References

2015 romantic comedy-drama films
Chinese romantic comedy-drama films
Chinese sequel films
Films based on Chinese novels
2015 comedy films
2015 drama films
2015 films